Bernard Charnwut Chan GBM GBS JP (11 January 1965), is a Hong Kong politician and businessman. He served as  Non-official Convenor of the Executive Council from 2017 to 2022.

Background 
Chan was born in Hong Kong with family roots in Chaoyang, Canton, also known by his Thai name Charnwut Sophonpanich. He is the grandson of Chin Sophonpanich, the late Thai Chinese founder of Bangkok Bank. He graduated from The Hill School in 1983 and Pomona College in 1988 with a BA in Studio Art. He is an investor in Thailand's Bumrungrad International Hospital. 

Chan is the Convener of the Non-official Members of the Executive Council, appointed by Carrie Lam in July 2017. He was a member of the Legislative Council (Legco) from 1998 to 2008, representing the Insurance constituency. He became a Hong Kong Deputy to National People's Congress of the People's Republic of China in 2008. He chairs several government advisory bodies: the Advisory Committee on Revitalizing Historical Buildings, the Standing Committee on Judicial Salaries and Condition of Services and the Hong Kong Council for Sustainable Development. He chaired the Antiquities Advisory Board from 2009–2013 and the Standing Committee on Disciplined Services Salaries and Condition of Services from 2001–2006.

Outside of politics, he is President of Asia Financial Holdings and its main subsidiary, Asia Insurance. 

Among his business successes are the formation in 1999 of Bank Consortium Trust, a joint venture of nine Hong Kong institutions that provides Mandatory Provident Fund services and of which he was founding chairman. He is also Chairman of The Hong Kong Council of Social Service, Chair of the Hong Kong-Thailand Business Council, Chairman of the Council of Lingnan University and Vice-Chairman of Oxfam Hong Kong; he is also chairman of the annual HK Oxfam Trailwalker event – a fund-raising 100-kilometre race that attracts teams from around the world. He played a part in the creation of Caring Company, a framework that creates partnerships between the business and welfare sectors. Chan has been awarded Commander (third class) of the Most Noble Order of the Crown of Thailand, the Grand Bauhinia Medal (GBM), the Gold Bauhinia Star (GBS) and Justice of the Peace (JP).

He held American and Thai citizenship until 2004, when he was appointed member of the Executive Council and was required to relinquish all other nationalities.

In April 2021, he wrote an opinion piece, claiming that the NPCSC's decision to reform elections and only allow "patriots" to serve in the government was good and that "Taxpayers should welcome the revamp."

In December 2021, it was reported that Chan had a "privileged" vote in the 2021 Hong Kong legislative election, where the vote would count approximately 7,215 times more than an ordinary citizen.

In June 2022, Chan defended Carrie Lam's legacy, and said that she should not be remembered for the protests and the government's pandemic response.

In July 2022, Chan attended a seminar to "learn and promote" the spirit of Xi Jinping's important speech.

In October 2022, Chan admitted that Singapore's government was the "winner" over Hong Kong's, in COVID-19 pandemic measures. Chan also said that Hong Kong's talent acquisition was hurt by its COVID-19 measures, and that the city was "too confident" in the past.

In November 2022, after the government sent a delegation to Thailand, Chan said "It sent a message to both locals and the outside world that Hong Kong is returning to normalcy." Though Chan said the city "returning to normalcy," he also mentioned Hong Kong's current COVID restrictions and said "We thank the government for allowing visitors with an amber code to visit museums."

Family

He is married to Singaporean Yeo Peck Leng and has two children.

In 2011, Chan's wife, Yeo Peck Leng, founded an "alternative" private primary school, the Almitas Academy, with the couple's two sons as the only pupils. A year later the strongly Christian school, which operates in a commercial building in North Point, had 12 pupils aged from six to 12, about a third of whom have special needs. The academy works closely with parents to nurture their children to their fullest potential. Effective 1 January 2013, the academy changed its status to a not for profit organisation and also took the opportunity to change the English name of the school to Grace Christian Academy.

According to his 2021 Declaration of Registrable Interests, he owns one residential property in Wan Chai, one in San Francisco, one in Bangkok, 3 in Sai Kung, and 2 parking lots in Sai Kung.

He is also a member of the American Club, Hong Kong Club, Hong Kong Country Club, and others.

Notes

References

External links
 Official website

1966 births
HK LegCo Members 1998–2000
HK LegCo Members 2000–2004
HK LegCo Members 2004–2008
Bernard Charnwut Chan
Delegates to the 11th National People's Congress from Hong Kong
Delegates to the 12th National People's Congress from Hong Kong
Delegates to the 13th National People's Congress from Hong Kong
Hong Kong businesspeople
Hong Kong people of Thai descent
Living people
Members of the Executive Council of Hong Kong
People who renounced United States citizenship
Pomona College alumni
Pomona College trustees
Professional Forum politicians
Recipients of the Gold Bauhinia Star
Bernard Charnwut Chan
The Hill School alumni
China Resources people
Members of the Election Committee of Hong Kong, 2021–2026